Breonia is a genus of flowering plants in the family Rubiaceae. It is endemic to Madagascar. Most species are trees, rarely shrubs.

Species

Breonia boivinii(Wikispecies) Havil.
Breonia capuronii(Wikispecies) Razafim.
Breonia chinensis(Wikispecies) (Lam.) Capuron – Bur-flower tree
Breonia cuspidata(Wikispecies) (Baker) Havil.
Breonia decaryana(Wikispecies) Homolle
Breonia fragifera(Wikispecies) Capuron ex Razafim.
Breonia havilandiana(Wikispecies) Homolle
Breonia louvelii(Wikispecies) Homolle
Breonia lowryi(Wikispecies) Razafim.
Breonia macrocarpa(Wikispecies) Homolle
Breonia madagascariensis A.Rich. ex DC.
Breonia membranacea(Wikispecies) Havil.
Breonia perrieri(Wikispecies) Homolle
Breonia richardsonii(Wikispecies) Razafim.
Breonia sambiranensis(Wikispecies) Razafim.
Breonia sphaerantha(Wikispecies) (Baill.) Homolle ex Ridsdale
Breonia stipulata(Wikispecies) Havil.
Breonia taolagnaroensis(Wikispecies) Razafim.
Breonia tayloriana(Wikispecies) Razafim.
Breonia tsaratananensis(Wikispecies) Razafim.

References

External links
Kew World Checklist of Selected Plant Families, Breonia

Rubiaceae genera
Naucleeae